The Snapper Creek is a creek in the U.S. state of Florida that drains out of the Everglades into Biscayne Bay at Biscayne National Park. The creek extends from Biscayne Bay inland to the Snapper Creek Canal, which extends  further to the Everglades.

History
Originally shallow in depth, the westernmost parts of creek have since been dredged and the original river connected to a canal system. This effort was spearheaded as a part of flood mitigation efforts in the 1940s by the Florida State Board of Conservation, who lobbied for the creation of South Florida Water Management District in 1948. The flood protection system intensified after extensive flooding in South Florida following the 1947 Fort Lauderdale Hurricane and the population explosion in Greater Miami and subsequent urban sprawl following World War II.

References

Bodies of water of Miami-Dade County, Florida
Rivers of Florida